is the second-largest city in Japan by population and the most populous municipality of Japan. It is the capital city and the most populous city in Kanagawa Prefecture, with a 2020 population of 3.8 million. It lies on Tokyo Bay, south of Tokyo, in the Kantō region of the main island of Honshu. Yokohama is also the major economic, cultural, and commercial hub of the Greater Tokyo Area along the Keihin Industrial Zone.

Yokohama was one of the cities to open for trade with the West following the 1859 end of the policy of seclusion and has since been known as a cosmopolitan port city, after Kobe opened in 1853. Yokohama is the home of many Japan's firsts in the Meiji period, including the first foreign trading port and Chinatown (1859), European-style sport venues (1860s), English-language newspaper (1861), confectionery and beer manufacturing (1865), daily newspaper (1870), gas-powered street lamps (1870s), railway station (1872), and power plant (1882). Yokohama developed rapidly as Japan's prominent port city following the end of Japan's relative isolation in the mid-19th century and is today one of its major ports along with Kobe, Osaka, Nagoya, Fukuoka, Tokyo and Chiba.

Yokohama is the largest port city and high tech industrial hub in the Greater Tokyo Area and the Kantō region. The city proper is headquarters to companies such as Isuzu, Nissan, JVCKenwood, Keikyu, Koei Tecmo, Sotetsu, Salesforce Japan and Bank of Yokohama. Famous landmarks in Yokohama include Minato Mirai 21, Nippon Maru Memorial Park, Yokohama Chinatown, Motomachi Shopping Street, Yokohama Marine Tower, Yamashita Park, and Ōsanbashi Pier.

Etymology
Yokohama (横浜) means "horizontal beach". The current area surrounded by Maita Park, the Ōoka River and the Nakamura River have been a gulf divided by a sandbar from the open sea. This sandbar was the original Yokohama fishing village. Since the sandbar protruded perpendicularly from the land, or horizontally when viewed from the sea, it was called a "horizontal beach".

History

Opening of the Treaty Port (1859–1868)
Before the Western foreigners arrived, Yokohama was a small fishing village up to the end of the feudal Edo period, when Japan held a policy of national seclusion, having little contact with foreigners. A major turning point in Japanese history happened in 1853–54, when Commodore Matthew Perry arrived just south of Yokohama with a fleet of American warships, demanding that Japan open several ports for commerce, and the Tokugawa shogunate agreed by signing the Treaty of Peace and Amity.

It was initially agreed that one of the ports to be opened to foreign ships would be the bustling town of Kanagawa-juku (in what is now Kanagawa Ward) on the Tōkaidō, a strategic highway that linked Edo to Kyoto and Osaka. However, the Tokugawa shogunate decided that Kanagawa-juku was too close to the Tōkaidō for comfort, and port facilities were instead built across the inlet in the sleepy fishing village of Yokohama. The Port of Yokohama was officially opened on June 2, 1859.

Yokohama quickly became the base of foreign trade in Japan. Foreigners initially occupied the low-lying district of the city called Kannai, residential districts later expanding as the settlement grew to incorporate much of the elevated Yamate district overlooking the city, commonly referred to by English speaking residents as The Bluff.

Kannai, the foreign trade and commercial district (literally, inside the barrier), was surrounded by a moat, foreign residents enjoying extraterritorial status both within and outside the compound.  Interactions with the local population, particularly young samurai, outside the settlement inevitably caused problems; the Namamugi Incident, one of the events that preceded the downfall of the shogunate, took place in what is now Tsurumi Ward in 1862, and prompted the Bombardment of Kagoshima in 1863.

To protect British commercial and diplomatic interests in Yokohama a military garrison was established in 1862. With the growth in trade increasing numbers of Chinese also came to settle in the city. Yokohama was the scene of many notable firsts for Japan including the growing acceptance of western fashion, photography by pioneers such as Felice Beato, Japan's first English language newspaper, the Japan Herald published in 1861 and in 1865 the first ice cream confectionery and beer to be produced in Japan.  Recreational sports introduced to Japan by foreign residents in Yokohama included European style horse racing in 1862, cricket in 1863 and rugby union in 1866. A great fire destroyed much of the foreign settlement on November 26, 1866, and smallpox was a recurrent public health hazard, but the city continued to grow rapidly – attracting foreigners and Japanese alike.

Meiji and Taisho Periods (1868–1923)
After the Meiji Restoration of 1868, the port was developed for trading silk, the main trading partner being Great Britain. Western influence and technological transfer contributed to the establishment of Japan's first daily newspaper (1870), first gas-powered street lamps (1872) and Japan's first railway constructed in the same year to connect Yokohama to Shinagawa and Shinbashi in Tokyo. In 1872 Jules Verne portrayed Yokohama, which he had never visited, in an episode of his widely read novel Around the World in Eighty Days, capturing the atmosphere of the fast-developing, internationally oriented Japanese city.

In 1887, a British merchant, Samuel Cocking, built the city's first power plant. At first for his own use, this coal power plant became the basis for the Yokohama Cooperative Electric Light Company. The city was officially incorporated on April 1, 1889. By the time the extraterritoriality of foreigner areas was abolished in 1899, Yokohama was the most international city in Japan, with foreigner areas stretching from Kannai to the Bluff area and the large Yokohama Chinatown.

The early 20th century was marked by rapid growth of industry. Entrepreneurs built factories along reclaimed land to the north of the city toward Kawasaki, which eventually grew to be the Keihin Industrial Area. The growth of Japanese industry brought affluence, and many wealthy trading families constructed sprawling residences there, while the rapid influx of population from Japan and Korea also led to the formation of Kojiki-Yato, then the largest slum in Japan.

Great Kantō earthquake and the Second World War (1923–1945)

Much of Yokohama was destroyed on September 1, 1923, by the Great Kantō earthquake. The Yokohama police reported casualties at 30,771 dead and 47,908 injured, out of a pre-earthquake population of 434,170. Fuelled by rumors of rebellion and sabotage, vigilante mobs thereupon murdered many Koreans in the Kojiki-yato slum. Many people believed that Koreans used black magic to cause the earthquake. Martial law was in place until November 19. Rubble from the quake was used to reclaim land for parks, the most famous being the Yamashita Park on the waterfront which opened in 1930.

Yokohama was rebuilt, only to be destroyed again by U.S. air raids during World War II. The first bombing was in the April 18, 1942 Doolittle Raid. An estimated 7,000–8,000 people were killed in a single morning on May 29, 1945, in what is now known as the Great Yokohama Air Raid, when B-29s firebombed the city and in just one hour and nine minutes, reducing 42% of it to rubble.

Postwar growth and development
During the American occupation, Yokohama was a major transshipment base for American supplies and personnel, especially during the Korean War. After the occupation, most local U.S. naval activity moved from Yokohama to an American base in nearby Yokosuka.

Four years after the Treaty of San Francisco signed, the city was designated by government ordinance on September 1, 1956. The city's tram and trolleybus system was abolished in 1972, the same year as the opening of the first line of Yokohama Municipal Subway. Construction of Minato Mirai 21 ("Port Future 21"), a major urban development project on reclaimed land started in 1983, nicknamed the "Philadelphia and Boston of the Orient" was compared to Center City, Philadelphia and Downtown Boston located in the East Coast of the United States. Minato Mirai 21 hosted the Yokohama Exotic Showcase in 1989, which saw the first public operation of maglev trains in Japan and the opening of Cosmo Clock 21, then the tallest Ferris wheel in the world. The  Yokohama Bay Bridge opened in the same year. In 1993, Minato Mirai 21 saw the opening of the Yokohama Landmark Tower, the second-tallest building in Japan.

The 2002 FIFA World Cup final was held in June at the International Stadium Yokohama. In 2009, the city marked the 150th anniversary of the opening of the port and the 120th anniversary of the commencement of the City Administration. An early part in the commemoration project incorporated the Fourth Tokyo International Conference on African Development (TICAD IV), which was held in Yokohama in May 2008. In November 2010, Yokohama hosted the Asia-Pacific Economic Cooperation (APEC) meeting.

Geography

Topography
It is the capital of Kanagawa Prefecture, bordered to the east by Tokyo Bay and located in the middle of the Kantō plain. The city is surrounded by hills and the characteristic mountain system of the island of Honshū, so its growth has been limited and it has had to gain ground from the sea. This also affects the population density, one of the highest in Japan with 8,500 inhabitants per km2.

The highest points within the urban boundary are Omaruyama and Mount Enkaizan. The main river is the Tsurumi River, which begins in the Tama Hills and empties into the Pacific Ocean.

These municipalities surround Yokohama: Kawasaki, Yokosuka, Zushi, Kamakura, Fujisawa, Yamato, Machida.

Geology
The city is very prone to natural phenomena such as earthquakes and tropical cyclones because the island of Honshū has a high level of seismic activity, being in the middle of the Pacific Ring of Fire.

Most seismic movements are of low intensity and are generally not perceived by people. However, Yokohama has experienced two major tremors that reflect the evolution of Earthquake engineering: the 1923 Great Kantō earthquake devastated the city and caused more than 100,000 fatalities throughout the region, while the 2011 Tōhoku earthquake and tsunami, with its epicenter on the east coast, was felt in the locality but only material damage was lamented because most buildings were already prepared to withstand them.

Climate
Yokohama features a humid subtropical climate (Köppen: Cfa) with hot, humid summers and chilly winters. Weatherwise, Yokohama has a pattern of rain, clouds and sun, although in winter, it is surprisingly sunny, more so than Southern Spain. Winter temperatures rarely drop below freezing, while summer can seem quite warm, because of the effects of humidity.

Cityscape

Demographics

Population

Yokohama's foreign population of 92,139 includes Chinese, Koreans, Filipinos, and Vietnamese.

Wards
Yokohama has 18 wards (ku):

Government and politics

The Yokohama City Council consists of 86 members elected from a total of 18 Wards. The LDP has minority control with 36 seats. The incumbent mayor is Takeharu Yamanaka, who defeated Fumiko Hayashi in the 2021 Yokohama mayoral election.

List of mayors (from 1889)

Culture and sights

Yokohama's cultural and tourist sights include:

 Yokohama Chinatown
 Yokohama Three Towers
 Yamashita Park (at the harbor)
 Harbor View Park
 The Hikawa Maru, historic passenger and cargo ship
 Yokohama Marine Tower
 Yokohama Triennale
 Minato Mirai 21
 Landmark Tower, 296 m high, second tallest skyscraper in Japan
 Nippon Maru, museum ship
 Yokohama Stadium (the Yokohama DeNA BayStars Pro baseball teams's home field)
 Yokohama Foreign Cemetery
 Sankei-en Garden
 Kishine-Park
 Kanazawa Bunko, preserves the cultural heritage of the Hōjō clan
 Zō-no-Hana Terrace (象の鼻テラス)
 Gumyōji, oldest temple in the city

Museums

There are 42 museums in the city area, including.

 CupNoodles Museum (Momofuku Andō Instant Ramen Museum): Several-floors of interactive exhibits related to the invention of the Japanese instant noodle soup, including soup kitchens where you can try the culture-specific noodle soups.
Kanagawa Prefectural Museum of Cultural History: Located in the historic Yokohama Specie Bank building.
Kanazawa Bunko: Traditional Japanese and Chinese art objects, many dating from the Kamakura period.
Matsuri Museum: Dedicated to the shrine festivals (Japanese Matsuri) taking place in Yokohama.
Silk Museum: Exhibits focusing on the production and processing of silk; including many clothes.
Yokohama Archives of History: Located in the former British Consulate building with exhibits related to port development and the arrival of Matthew Perry.
Yokohama Museum of Art: Founded in 1989, featuring modern works by well-known international and Japanese artists.

Gallery

Excursion destinations
In 2016, 46,017,157 tourists visited the city, 13.1% of whom were overnight guests.
 Kodomo no kuni: Means "Children's country". A nice destination to spend an eventful day with the family. Lots of space for walking and playing. There is also a petting zoo.
 Nogeyama Zoo: One of the few zoos that do not charge admission. It has a large number of animals and a petting zoo where children can play with small animals.
 Zoorasia: Nice zoo with lots of play options for children. However, in this zoo admission costs.
 Yokohama Hakkeijima Sea Paradise: A large park with an aquarium. Otherwise rides, shops, restaurants, etc.
 Since 2020, after six years of development, a giant robot named Gundam, which is 18 meters high and weighs 25 tons, has been watching over the port area as a tourist attraction. The giant robot, in which there is a cockpit and whose hands are each two meters long, is based as a figure on a science fiction television series, can move and sink to its knees. The giant robot was manufactured by the company "Gundam Factory Yokohama" under Managing Director Shin Sasaki.
 Kamonyama Park

In popular media 

 Yukio Mishima's novel The Sailor Who Fell from Grace with the Sea is set mainly in Yokohama. Mishima describes the city's port and its houses, and the Western influences that shaped them.
 From Up on Poppy Hill is a 2011 Studio Ghibli animated drama film directed by Gorō Miyazaki set in the Yamate district of Yokohama. The film is based on the serialized Japanese comic book of the same name.
 The main setting of James Clavell's book Gai-Jin is in historical Yokohama.
 Vermillion City in the Kanto region from the Pokémon franchise is based on Yokohama.
 One of the Pretty Cure crossover movies takes place in Yokohama. In the fourth movie of the series, Pretty Cure All Stars New Stage: Friends of the Future, the Pretty Cure appear standing on top of the Cosmo Clock 21 in Minato Mirai.
 The main setting of the Japanese visual novel series Muv-Luv, first a school and then, in an alternate history, a military base is built in Yokohama with the objective of carrying out the Alternative IV Plan meant to save humanity.
 In Command & Conquer: Red Alert 3, Yokohama is under siege by the Soviet Union and Allied Nations to stop the Empire of The Rising Sun. The player must defend Yokohama and then lead a counterattack as the Empire.
 The manga Bungo Stray Dogs is set in Yokohama.
 The Japanese mixed-media project, Hamatora takes place in Yokohama.
 The final battle in Godzilla, Mothra and King Ghidorah: Giant Monsters All-Out Attack takes place in Yokohama.
 In My Hero Academia, it is the location of the Nomu Warehouse where they created artificial Humans (a.k.a. Nomus).
 Sumaru City in Persona 2: Innocent Sin and Eternal Punishment is based on Yokohama.
 Miyabi City in The Caligula Effect is based on Yokohama, including depictions of landmarks such as an unfinished Landmark Tower and Yokohama Hakkeijima Sea Paradise (referred to in game as Sea Paraiso).
 The video game Yakuza: Like a Dragon is set in Isezaki Ijincho, a fictional district in Yokohama based on Isezakichō.
 Yokohama is also represented in the multimedia project by King Records, Hypnosis Mic: Division Rap Battle
 Yokohama is the main setting of Japanese manga and anime series Komi Can't Communicate. Multiple of the cities’ landmarks are featured on the manga, most notably in the more recently released chapters.
 Yokohama is the setting of the anime After the Rain as well as manga series with the same title by Jun Mayuzuki.
In April 2022, The Yokohama Convention & Visitors Bureau announced the launch of a new interactive website to aid in the tourism and MICE elements of the city.

Sports 

Baseball: Yokohama DeNA BayStars
Soccer: Yokohama F. Marinos (J.League Division 1), Yokohama FC (J.League Division 1), YSCC Yokohama  (J.League Division 3), NHK Yokohama FC Seagulls (Nadeshiko League Div.2)
Velodrome: Kagetsu-en Velodrome
Basketball: Yokohama B-Corsairs
Rugby Union: Yokohama Eagles
Tennis: Ai Sugiyama
American football: Yokohama Harbors

Economy and infrastructure
The city has a strong economic base, especially in the shipping, biotechnology, and semiconductor industries. Nissan moved its headquarters to Yokohama from Chūō, Tokyo, in 2010.
Yokohama's GDP per capita (Nominal) was $30,625 ($1=¥120.13).

, the total production in Yokohama city reached ¥13.56 billion. It is located between Shizuoka and Hiroshima Prefectures compared to domestic prefectures. It is located between Hungary, which ranks 26th, and New Zealand, which ranks 27th compared to OECD countries. Generally, the primary industry is 0.1%, the secondary industry is 21.7%, and the tertiary industry is 82.3%. The ratio of the primary industry is low, and the ratio of the secondary industry and the tertiary industry is high. Compared to other ordinance-designated cities, it is about 60% of the size of Osaka, which is almost the same as Nagoya. As shown in the attached table, there are not a few head office companies,  In connection with this, the absence of large block-type companies (JR, NTT, electric power, gas, major commercial broadcasters, etc.) has had an impact.

The breakdown is ¥11.9 million yen (0.1%) for the primary industry, ¥2.75 billion (21.7%) for the secondary industry, and ¥10.44 billion yen (82.3%) for the tertiary industry. Compared to other government-designated cities, the amount of the primary industry, the ratio of the construction industry of the secondary industry, and the ratio of the real estate industry of the tertiary industry are large, and the finance, insurance, wholesale, and retail of the tertiary industry The ratio of industry and service industry is small, but the tertiary industry is almost the same as Nagoya.

Major companies headquartered

Transport

Yokohama is serviced by the Tōkaidō Shinkansen, a high-speed rail line with a stop at Shin-Yokohama Station. Yokohama Station is also a major station, with two million passengers daily. The Yokohama Municipal Subway, Minatomirai Line and Kanazawa Seaside Line provide metro services.

Air transport
Yokohama doesn't have an airport, but is served by Tokyo's two main airports Haneda Airport which is 17.4 km away and Narita International Airport which is 77 km away.

Maritime transport
Yokohama is the world's 31st largest seaport in terms of total cargo volume, at 121,326 freight tons , and is ranked 37th in terms of TEUs (Twenty-foot equivalent units).

In 2013, APM Terminals Yokohama facility was recognized as the most productive container terminal in the world averaging 163 crane moves per hour, per ship between the vessel's arrival and departure at the berth.

Rail transport

Railway stations 
  East Japan Railway Company (JR East)
  Tōkaidō Main Line
 –  –  –
  Yokosuka Line
 – Yokohama –  –  – Totsuka –
  Keihin-Tōhoku Line
 –  –  –  – Yokohama
  Negishi Line
 Yokohama –  –  –  –  –  –  –  –  –  –  –
  Yokohama Line
 Higashi-Kanagawa –  –  –  –  –  –  –  –  –
  Nambu Line
 –  –
  Tsurumi Line
 Main Line : Tsurumi –  –  –  –  –  –
 Umi-Shibaura Branch : Asano –  – 
  Central Japan Railway Company (JR Central)
  Tōkaidō Shinkansen
 – Shin-Yokohama –
  Keikyu
  Keikyu Main Line
 –  –  –  –  –  –  –  –  –  – Yokohama –  –  –  –  –  –  –  –  –  –  –  –  –  –
  Keikyu Zushi Line
 Kanazawa-Hakkei –  –
  Tokyu Railways
  Tōyoko Line
 –  –  –  – Kikuna –  –  –  –  – Yokohama
  Meguro Line
 – Hiyoshi
  Den-en-toshi Line
 –  –  –  –  –  –  –  – Nagatsuta –
  Kodomonokuni Line
 Nagatsuta –  – 
  Sagami Railway
  Sagami Railway Main Line
 Yokohama –  –  –  –  –  –  –  –  –  –  –  –  –
  Izumino Line
 Futamatagawa –  –  –  –  –  – 
  Yokohama Minatomirai Railway
  Minatomirai Line
 Yokohama –  –  –  –  – 
  Yokohama City Transportation Bureau (Yokohama Municipal Subway)
  Blue Line
 –  –  –  –  – Totsuka –  –  –  –  – Kami-Ōoka –  –  –  –  –  – Kannai – Sakuragichō –  – Yokohama –  –  –  –  – Shin-Yokohama –  –  –  –  –  –  – 
  Green Line
 Nakayama –  –  – Center Minami – Center Kita –  –  –  –  – Hiyoshi
  Yokohama New Transit
  Kanazawa Seaside Line
 Shin-Sugita –  –  –  –  –  –  –  –  –  –  –  –  – Kanazawa-Hakkei

Education 
Public elementary and middle schools are operated by the city of Yokohama. There are nine public high schools which are operated by the Yokohama City Board of Education, and a number of public high schools which are operated by the Kanagawa Prefectural Board of Education. Yokohama National University is a leading university in Yokohama which is also one of the highest ranking national universities in Japan.

 46,388 children attend the 260 kindergartens.
 Almost 386,000 students are taught in 351 primary schools.
 There are 16 universities including Yokohama National University. The number of students is around 83,000.
 19 public libraries had 9.5 million loans in 2016.

International relations

Twin towns – sister cities
Yokohama is twinned with:

  Constanța, Constanța County, Romania (since October 1977)
  Lyon, Auvergne-Rhône-Alpes, France (since April 1959)
  Manila, Philippines (since July 1965)
  Mumbai, Maharashtra, India (since June 1965)
  Odesa, Odesa Oblast, Ukraine (since July 1965)
  San Diego, CA, United States (former partnership, October 1957–October 2021)
  San Francisco, CA, United States (since October 2021)
  Shanghai, China (since November 1973)
  Vancouver, BC, Canada (since July 1965)

Partner cities

  Abidjan, Ivory Coast
  Beijing, China (since May 2006)
  Brisbane, Queensland, Australia (since June 2008)
  Busan, South Korea (since June 2006)
  Frankfurt, Hesse, Germany (since September 2011)
  Hanoi, Vietnam (since November 2007)
  Ho Chi Minh City, Vietnam (since October 2007)
  Incheon, South Korea (since December 2009)
  Seberang Perai, Penang, Malaysia (since August 2016)
  Taipei, Taiwan (since May 2006)
  Tel Aviv, Israel (since July 2012)
  Tianjin, China (since May 2008)

Sister ports

  Port of Barcelona, Spain (since November 1989)
  Port of Dalian (friendship port treaty, since September 1990)
  Port of Hamburg, Germany (since October 1992)
  Port of Melbourne, Australia (since May 1986)
  Port of Oakland, United States (since May 1980)
  Port of Vancouver, Canada (since May 1981)
  Port of Shanghai (friendship port treaty, since October 1983)

Notable people 
Toru Furuya, singer and seiyū
Yuma Kagiyama, figure skater 
Miki Koyama, racing driver 
Takehito Koyasu, singer and seiyū
Ryuji Kumita, racing driver and CEO of B-Max Racing
Keisuke Kunimoto, racing driver
Yuji Kunimoto, racing driver
Minoru Suzuki, professional wrestler
Yuta Watanabe, NBA player for the Toronto Raptors.
Radwimps

References

Citations

Sources 

 Hammer, Joshua (2006). Yokohama Burning: The Deadly 1923 Earthquake and Fire that Helped Forge the Path to World War II . New York: Simon & Schuster.   (cloth).
 Heilbrun, Jacob. "Aftershocks" . The New York Times, September 17, 2006.

External links

Official Website 
Yokohama Tourism Website 
 

 
Environmental model cities
Populated coastal places in Japan
Port settlements in Japan
Cities in Kanagawa Prefecture
Cities designated by government ordinance of Japan